The Beckley Jackson House, which has also been known as The Stagecoach Inn, near Hanson, Kentucky, was built .  It was listed on the National Register of Historic Places in 1989.

It was built as a Flemish bond brick single cell central passage plan house on what was then the Jackson-Providence Road.  There may have been an original ell to the rear;  a new ell replaced that around 1900, and an enclosed porch was added c.1920.

It was deemed " significant for its association as an early stage coach stop and post office in ante-bellum Hopkins County. It is the only building from this period associated with early inns along historic road routes in the county. The house is also the only remaining ante-bellum brick building in the rural area of the county."

References

Houses on the National Register of Historic Places in Kentucky
Houses completed in 1830
National Register of Historic Places in Hopkins County, Kentucky
Hotel buildings on the National Register of Historic Places in Kentucky
1830 establishments in Kentucky
Central-passage houses
Stagecoach stations in the United States
Transportation in Hopkins County, Kentucky
Houses in Hopkins County, Kentucky